Tamin may refer to:
Tamin
Tamin Rural District
Famotidine
Tamin (state constituency), represented in the Sarawak State Legislative Assembly